"Into Your Arms" is a 1989 song by Australian duo Love Positions, consisting of Robyn St. Clare (who wrote the song) and Nic Dalton.

In 1992, Dalton joined American alternative rock band the Lemonheads, who covered the song on their sixth studio album, Come on Feel the Lemonheads (1993). The song was released as the album's lead single and reached number one on the US Billboard Modern Rock Tracks chart, remaining atop the chart for nine straight weeks, a record at the time that they shared with U2. The song also reached number 67 on the Billboard Hot 100 and charted in Australia, Canada, and the UK; in the latter country, it was a top-20 hit.

Track listings

US cassette single
 "Into Your Arms" (LP version)
 "Miss Otis Regrets"

US, UK, and Australian CD single; UK 10-inch EP
 "Into Your Arms" – 2:45
 "Miss Otis Regrets" – 2:40
 "Little Black Egg" – 2:15
 "Learning the Game" – 1:18

European maxi-CD single
 "Into Your Arms"
 "Miss Otis Regrets"
 "Learning the Game"

UK 7-inch and cassette single
 "Into Your Arms" – 2:45
 "Miss Otis Regrets" – 2:40

Charts

See also
 List of Billboard number-one alternative singles of the 1990s

References

1993 singles
1993 songs
Atlantic Records singles
Jangle pop songs
The Lemonheads songs